Grade retention or  grade repetition is the process of a student repeating a grade due to failing on the previous year.

An alternative to grade retention due to failure is a policy of social promotion, with the idea that staying within their same age group is important. Social promotion is the obligatory advancement of all students regardless of achievements and absences. Social promotion is used more in countries which use tracking to group students according to academic ability. Some academic scholars believe that underperformance must be addressed with intensive remedial help, such as summer school or after-school programs in contrast to failing and retaining the student.

In most countries, retention rates are currently decreasing. In the United States, grade retention can be used in kindergarten through to twelfth grade; however, students in grades seven through twelve are usually only retained in the specific failed subject due to each subject having its own specific classroom rather than staying in one classroom with all subjects taught for the entire school day as it is in grades kindergarten through sixth grade. For example, in grades seven through to twelve, a student can be promoted in a math class but retained in a language class. Some elementary school grades (kindergarten or 1st grade to 5th or 6th grade) are confined to one room for the whole day, being taught all subjects in the same classroom usually by one teacher with the exception of art and gymnastics conducted in the art room and the gymnasium respectively. In these grades, the student must generally fail or score well below the accepted level in most or all areas within the entire curriculum to be retained. The student will then again repeat the entire school year within a single classroom and repeating the same subject matter as the previous year.

Where it is permitted, grade retention is most common among at-risk students in early elementary school. At-risk students with intellectual disabilities are only retained when parents and school officials agree to do so. Children who are relatively young in their age cohort are four times more likely to be retained.

History
Different schools have used different approaches throughout history. Grade retention or repetition was essentially meaningless in the one-room schoolhouses of more than a century ago due to limited access to outside standards and the small scale of the school with only a few students in each age group, was conducive to individualized instruction. With the proliferation of larger, graded schools in the middle of the nineteenth century, retention became a common practice and only one century ago, about half of all American students were retained at least once before the age of thirteen.

Social promotion began to spread in the 1930s with concerns about the psychosocial effects of retention. Social promotion is the promoting of underperforming students under the ideological principle that staying with their same age peers is important to success. This trend reversed in the 1980s as concerns about slipping academic standards rose, and the practice of grade retention in the United States has been climbing steadily ever since. The practice of making retention decisions on the basis of the results of a single test called high-stakes testing is widely condemned by professional educators. Test authors generally advise that their tests are not adequate for high stakes decisions, and that decisions should be made based on all the facts and circumstances.

Research

There is no conclusive evidence that grade retention is significantly helpful, and much of the existing research has been methodologically invalid due to the selection bias in the group allocation phase. The three different types of studies that exist or have been proposed have inherent pitfalls to overcome before the resulting data can be deemed as accurate.
 Studies that compare students who were retained with students who were only considered for retention and were eventually promoted, concluded that social promotion is beneficial to the students. The students that were selected for promotion were often viewed as “better”, or “less weak” than the students that were retained, and the “better” students were selected for promotion “because the school believed them to be stronger or more personally mature students”, whereas the students that were selected for retention were viewed as “weaker” students and were retained as a result of this.
 Studies that compare retained students with their own prior performance seem to favor grade retention; however, these studies are inaccurate because they do not adequately compensate for personal growth, or stressful changes at home like abusive living conditions, or drastic environmental issues such as living in poverty; all of which will have a definitive impact on the students performance.
 Studies which randomly assign a large pool of borderline students to promotion or retention is the most methodologically sound type of research of this topic. It is imperative that the research is provided with sufficiently detailed information on a large enough scale in order to provide valuable or possibly even definitive information. Although this method can potentially provide the most accurate results, schools and parents are unwilling to have a child's future determined by random assignment, therefore, due to institutional and parental opposition, along with other ethical reasons, these types of studies are not utilized.

"Non-academic outcomes": Retention is commonly associated with poor social adjustment, disruptive behavior, negative attitudes towards school and low academic attendance." Retention is a "stronger predictor of delinquency than socioeconomic status, race, or ethnicity," and is also a strong predictor of drug and alcohol use and teenage pregnancy.

International

Australia
Australia uses grade retention, although in 2010 the New South Wales Department of Education and Training enacted a policy that states that student retention will no longer be allowed at any school. For example, as of 2010, students will not be repeating eleventh grade or twelfth grade due to the abundance of post school services available to them after they complete twelfth grade, services such as TAFEs or college universities.

New Zealand
In New Zealand, secondary schools commonly use a system of internal academic streaming in which children of the same age are subdivided on the basis of ability, and lower achieving students (those who would be retained under the North American system) are taught in different classes, and at a different rate, from higher achieving students, but are kept within their own age group. This system has largely rendered grade retention obsolete in all but the most exceptional circumstances.

In most cases where academic streaming is insufficient, additional special services are viewed as being preferential to grade retention, particularly when behavioral challenges are involved.

Argentina
Argentina contemplates grade retention in all grades except first grade and the last course of high school. In elementary school, students are retained when they fail one of the basic areas: math, language and social sciences. In secondary school, students are allowed a maximum of two courses failed in order to be promoted. If they fail three or more, they should repeat.

East Asia
South Korea, Malaysia and North Korea do not practice grade retention. Although grade retention is technically possible in Japan, the practice is largely obsolete.

Singapore
Singapore practices grade retention in secondary schools if a student is unsuccessful in achieving a satisfactory accumulated percentage grade. The school authorities may also decide that it would be more appropriate for the student to advance to a higher level in a lower stream such as in the cases of "express" and "normal" (academic) students. Grade retention is most common in junior colleges where a promotional criterion is set in place.

Hong Kong
Hong Kong practices grade retention in elementary and secondary school if the student obtains a failing grade even after taking a retest.

Western Europe
Norway, Denmark and Sweden do not allow grade retention during elementary school and junior high school (1-10th grade).

In the United Kingdom, a similar streaming system to New Zealand's is used. The exception to this is that students at sixth form (the final two years of secondary education, where there is not usually streaming) may have to repeat a year if they fail a year during this period or complete an access year if they do not get good enough grades at 16.

Austria, Belgium, France, Germany, Italy, Luxembourg, the Netherlands, Portugal, Spain and Switzerland commonly use grade retention.

Greece allows grade retention if a student fails more than five final exams, or five or fewer both in May examinations and in September examinations. A student who has missed more than 114 periods of class can also repeat a grade.

North America

The United States and Canada both use grade retention.

In the U.S., six-year-old students are most likely to be retained, with another spike around the age of 12. In particular, some large schools have a transitional classroom, sometimes called "kindergarten 2", for six year olds who are not reading ready.

Common arguments
The following are common arguments regarding this practice.

Arguments against
Opponents of "no social promotion" policies do not defend social promotion so much as say that retention is even worse. They argue that retention is not a cost-effective response to poor performance when compared to cheaper or more effective interventions, such as additional tutoring and summer school. They point to a wide range of research findings that show no advantage to, or even harm from, retention, and the tendency for gains from retention to see out.

Harm from retention cited by these critics include:
 Lowers the academic self esteem of the student and make them feel as if they were mentally inferior and in turn cause them to give up on their academics. It may also cause them to be the subject of ridicule and bullying by other students.
 Increased drop out rates of retained students over time. The increased drop out rates of retained students can be explained by the negative impact of grade retention on the self-confidence of students and the psychological impact of not being able to progress with their classmates.
 No evidence of long term academic benefit for retained students.
 They will not be able to progress with their classmates, which will cause a feeling of separation since most students stay with the same group throughout school.
 It keeps the children in the same age groups.
 Danger to normally progressing younger students in the class which the older student is required to repeat, when the intellectually challenged older student is likely to possess a great level of physical development.
 Decreased hiring chances. Indeed, grade retention has been shown in research to reduce the probability of being invited for a job interview in certain jobs. In cases of grade retention, applicants for jobs for which extra training is important, have 16% less positive reactions on their applications.

Critics of retention also note that retention is expensive for school systems: requiring a student to repeat a grade is essentially to add one student for a year to the school system, assuming that the student does not drop out.

The possibility of grade retention has been shown to be a significant source of stress for students. In one study of childhood fears performed in the 1980s, the top three fears for US sixth graders were a parent's death, going blind, and being retained. After two decades of increasing retention practices, a repeat of the study in 2001 found that grade retention was the single greatest fear, higher than loss of a parent or going blind. This change likely reflects the students correct perception that they were statistically far more likely to repeat the sixth grade than to suffer the death of a parent or the loss of their vision.

Arguments for

Opponents of social promotion argue that passing a child who did not learn the necessary material cheats the child of an education. As a result, when the child gets older, the student will likely fail classes or be forced to attend summer school. Opponents of social promotion argue that some children would benefit from an additional year, especially in Kindergarten, to mature and develop social and emotional skills. This additional time will assist students with improved academic performance.
Opponents of social promotion argue that it has the following negative impacts:
 Students who are promoted cannot do the work in the next grade, and so are being set up for further failure.
 Students will have many failures in the high school years, which will most likely lead to dropping out.
 It sends the message to all students that they can get by without working hard.
 It forces teachers to deal with under prepared students while trying to teach the prepared.
 It gives parents a false sense of their children's progress.
 It will not get them the help they need.
 Florida, the first state to end social promotion in third grade, now has the highest reading scores in the nation for disadvantaged fourth grade students according to the National Assessment of Educational Progress.

See also 
 Super senior

References

Further reading
Examining the Negative Effects of Retention in Our Schools

Education issues